Afrospilarctia dentivalva is a moth of the family Erebidae. It was described by Vladimir Viktorovitch Dubatolov in 2011. It can be found in Zambia.

References

Spilosomina
Moths described in 2011
Moths of Africa